Michael Rodgers may refer to:

 Mike Rodgers (born 1985), American track and field athlete
 Michael E. Rodgers (born 1969), British actor
 Michael Rodgers (singer) on Steve Lukather discography
 Michael Rodgers (art historian), Slade Professor of Fine Art

See also
Michael Rogers (disambiguation)